Lyons  is a brand of tea belonging to ekaterra that is sold in Ireland. It is one of the two dominant tea brands in the market within the Republic of Ireland, along with Barry's Tea. 

Lyons Tea was first produced by J. Lyons and Co., a catering empire created and built by the Salmons and Glucksteins, a German-Jewish immigrant family based in London. Starting in 1904, J Lyons began selling packaged tea through its network of teashops. Soon after, they began selling their own brand Lyons Tea through retailers in the UK, Ireland and around the world. In 1918, Lyons purchased Hornimans and in 1921 they moved their tea factory to J. Lyons and Co., Greenford at that time, the largest tea factory in Europe.

In 1962, J Lyons and Company (Ireland) became Lyons Irish Holdings. After a merger with Allied Breweries in 1978, Lyons Irish Holdings became part of Allied Lyons (later Allied Domecq) who then sold the company to Unilever in 1996.  Today, Lyons Tea is produced in England. Lyons Tea was a major advertiser in the early decades of RTÉ Television, featuring the "Lyons minstrels" and coupon-based prize competitions.

The story of J Lyons is told in the book 'Legacy: One Family, a Cup of Tea and the Company that Took On the World' by Thomas Harding (writer)

Popular culture
A Lyons Tea sign is shown in the background in a scene in Castletown in The Quiet Man (1952), the iconic film directed by John Ford that starred John Wayne and Maureen O'Hara. Again in Ford’s How Green Was My Valley (1941) an advertisement for Lyon’s Tea is to be seen in an early scene under the shop window near the church. 

In the BBC/RTÉ Mrs Brown's Boys TV series, there is a box of Lyons Tea sitting on top of the bread bin in Mrs Brown's kitchen.

In Chariots of Fire, a Lyons sign is shown at Dover train station.

References

External links
 

Tea brands in Ireland
Food companies of the Republic of Ireland
Unilever brands
Food and drink companies established in 1902
1902 establishments in Ireland